Back to Square One is a 1994 German comedy film directed by Reinhard Münster. It was entered into the 44th Berlin International Film Festival.

Cast

References

External links

1994 films
1994 comedy films
1990s German-language films
Films directed by Reinhard Münster
Films about filmmaking
German comedy films
1990s German films